Maison des Sciences de l'Homme also known as MSH a is a research foundation based in Paris, France. MSH provides a platform for national and international collaboration between various institutions, fields and researchers. It was enacted on January the 4th 1963. The work of MSH includes re-grouping various researches and work tools under the same building, to conduct new research through the process of experimentation. MSH re-collects, publicize and distributes the scientific data.

References

Non-profit organizations based in France
1963 establishments in France